Abdulmalek Abdullah Al-Khaibri (born 13 March 1986) is a Saudi Arabian football player who plays as a midfielder.

Club career
Al-Khaibri played for Al-Qadisiyah between 2007 and 2008. During the summer of 2008, Al-Khaibri was at the center of controversy when he signed for both Al-Nassr and Al-Shabab. The Saudi Arabian Football Federation eventually ruled in favor of Al-Shabab and Al-Khaibri was suspended for four months.

Al-Shabab
Al-Khaibri made his debut for Al-Shabab on 30 November 2008 in the league match against Al-Raed. In his first season at the club, he managed to win the King Cup and Federation Cup. During the 2011–12 season, Al-Khaibri made 11 league appearances as Al-Shabab managed to win the league title and finish the season unbeaten. He scored his first goal for the club against Hajer on 25 November 2011. On 1 March 2013, Al-Khaibri signed a new three-year deal with Al-Shabab. In the 2013–14 season, Al-Khaibri played in all 6 matches of the King Cup as Al-Shabab went on to win their third title. After entering the last six months of his contract, Al-Khaibri refused to renew his contract and left at the end of the 2015–16 season.

Al-Hilal
On 5 June 2016, Al-Khaibri joined city rivals Al-Hilal on a free transfer. He signed a three-year deal with the club. In his first season, the club won the League and Cup double.

Al-Shabab return
On 6 July 2019, Al-Khaibri joined Al-Shabab on a free transfer.

International career
In May 2018 he was named in Saudi Arabia's squad for the 2018 FIFA World Cup in Russia, although he did not play in any of the matches.

Career statistics

Club

International
Statistics accurate as of match played 14 June 2018.

Honours

Al-Shabab
Pro League: 2011–12
King Cup: 2009, 2014
Saudi Super Cup: 2014
Saudi Federation Cup: 2008–09, 2009–10

Al-Hilal
Pro League: 2016–17, 2017–18
King Cup: 2017
Saudi Super Cup: 2018

References

1986 births
Living people
Saudi Arabian footballers
Saudi Arabia international footballers
Association football midfielders
Sportspeople from Riyadh
Al-Qadsiah FC players
Al-Shabab FC (Riyadh) players
Al Hilal SFC players
Al-Riyadh SC players
Saudi First Division League players
Saudi Professional League players
Saudi Second Division players
2018 FIFA World Cup players